Morten Messerschmidt (born 13 November 1980) is a Danish politician and current leader of the Danish People's Party. He was a elected Member of the Folketing at the 2019 Danish general election having previously served from 2005 to 2009. At the 2014 European Parliament election, he was elected a Member of the European Parliament for Denmark with 465,758; the highest amount of personal votes ever cast at a Danish election.

Political career 
Before taking his seat in the European Parliament, Messerschmidt was a member of the Danish Parliament from 8 February 2005, having won his seat with 3,812 personal votes, and reelected in 2007, this time getting 11,466 votes. For a short period of time in 2007, he left the Danish People's Party, due to accusations of Nazism, as he according to the tabloid newspaper B.T. had praised Adolf Hitler in Tivoli.

In 2009 he was elected to the European Parliament, winning his seat in a landslide in the 2009 elections with 284,500 personal votes, and in 2014 he was reelected with 465,758 personal votes. From 2014 to 2016, he was the group leader of the party, until his resignation in August 2016. On 1 March 2018 Messerschmidt was one of three Danish MEPs who voted against a motion to encourage national parliaments to ban "gay conversion therapies". In 2019, he was elected to the Folketing with 7,554 personal votes, and in 2020 became vice chairman of the DPP, replacing Søren Espersen.

Messerschmidt was convicted in 2002 for publishing material that attempted to link Islamic societies to rape, violence and forced marriages.

Fraud scandal 
In August 2016, Messerschmidt resigned as EU parliament group leader for the DPP, as a result of a scandal involving the related foundations FELD and MELD that he had managed. OLAF launched an investigation into misuse of EU funds, and Messerschmidt was reported to the police for identity theft by MEP Rikke Karlsson, who had left the DPP in 2015 in protest against Messerschmidt's alleged withholding of information about the foundations. Karlsson and then-fellow DPP MEP Jørn Dohrmann had been elected to the board of MELD without their knowledge. Ekstra Bladet was nominated for a European Press Prize for investigative reporting in 2017 for their coverage of the scandal.

In 2021, he was charged with misuse of 98.000 DKK in EU funds. On August 13, 2021, he was sentenced to 6 months of conditional prison, but The High Court of Eastern Denmark annulled the verdict in December 2021 due to the judge been deemed unable by the Independent Police Complaints Authority of Denmark. On 21 December 2022 Messerschmidt was acquitted of all charges by the Court of Frederiksberg.

Personal life 
In 2021, Messerschmidt became the legal guardian of his sister's children, after his sister was murdered.

Bibliography
Den kristne arv (2021)
Farvel til folkestyret: hvordan EU ødelægger frihed, folk og folkestyre - og hvad vi kan gøre ved det (2020)
Overlad det trygt til Bruxelles – Debat om EU (2015, co-author)
Intet over og intet ved siden af ... ‒ EU-Domstolen og dens aktivisme (2013)

References

External links 
 Biography on the website of the Danish Parliament (Folketinget)

1980 births
Living people
People from Frederikssund Municipality
Danish writers
Danish People's Party politicians
Danish People's Party MEPs
MEPs for Denmark 2009–2014
MEPs for Denmark 2014–2019
People convicted of racial hatred offences
Members of the Folketing 2005–2007
Members of the Folketing 2007–2011
Members of the Folketing 2019–2022
Members of the Folketing 2022–2026